Whitney Conder (born May 6, 1988) is an American freestyle wrestler. In September 2012, she joined the U.S. Army as part of the World Class Athlete Program and serves with the military police. As a WCAP athlete, Conder has been a World Team member four times, a five-time national champion, and won a Military World silver medal.  She won the gold medal in the 53 kg weight division at the 2015 Pan American Games.

Conder was born to Sharon and Monte Conder. She has two brothers, Nate and Dustin Condor, and two sisters, Shantel Bird and Kim Jackson.

References

External links
 

1988 births
Living people
American female sport wrestlers
United States Army soldiers
Pan American Games medalists in wrestling
Pan American Games gold medalists for the United States
Wrestlers at the 2015 Pan American Games
Wrestlers at the 2019 Pan American Games
Medalists at the 2015 Pan American Games
Medalists at the 2019 Pan American Games
21st-century American women
U.S. Army World Class Athlete Program
20th-century American women